QubeTV was a politically conservative alternative to YouTube. The site was founded by former Ronald Reagan aides Charlie Gerow and Jeff Lord as a response to what is perceived to be a liberal bias on the part of YouTube. Cited among other claims of the liberal bias of YouTube is the censorship of a video by conservative personality Michelle Malkin about US immigration which was taken down by YouTube administrators. The Malkin video now has a prominent position on the frontpage of QubeTV and is described as "Banned by YouTube". The site has been compared to Conservapedia, a Christian conservative alternative to Wikipedia.

Comedian Lewis Black has discussed QubeTV during one of his appearances on The Daily Show with Jon Stewart. In particular, he has pointed out that a large number of the videos on the website are in fact links to YouTube, stating that "the conservative alternative to YouTube is YouTube."

See also
 Conservapedia
 Censorship by YouTube

References

External links
 QubeTV

Video hosting